The bay coucal (Centropus celebensis) is a species of cuckoo in the family Cuculidae. It is endemic to Indonesia.

Its natural habitats are subtropical or tropical moist lowland forest and subtropical or tropical moist montane forest.

References

bay coucal
Endemic birds of Sulawesi
bay coucal
Taxonomy articles created by Polbot